Erodium alnifolium is a species of annual herb in the family Geraniaceae. They have a self-supporting growth form.

Sources

References 

alnifolium
Flora of Malta